Sulfite reductases are enzymes that participate in sulfur metabolism. They catalyze the reduction of sulfite to hydrogen sulfide and water. Electrons for the reaction are provided by a dissociable molecule of either NADPH, bound flavins, or ferredoxins.

 SO32− (sulfite) + electron donor   H2S (hydrogen sulfide) + oxidized donor + 3 H2O

Sulfite reductases, which belong to the oxidoreductase family, are found in archaea, bacteria, fungi, and plants. They are grouped as either assimilatory or dissimilatory sulfite reductases depending on their function, their spectroscopic properties, and their catalytic properties.  This enzyme participates in selenoamino acid metabolism and sulfur assimilation. It employs two covalently coupled cofactors - an  iron sulfur cluster and a siroheme - which  deliver electrons to the substrate via this coupling.

The systematic name of this enzyme class is hydrogen-sulfide:acceptor oxidoreductase. Other names in common use include assimilatory sulfite reductase, assimilatory-type sulfite reductase, and hydrogen-sulfide:(acceptor) oxidoreductase.

References

Further reading 

 
 
 

EC 1.8.99
Iron enzymes
Sulfur metabolism